Sunjung Kim is a Seoul-based curator and Professor at the Korea National University of Arts who has played a pivotal role in linking Korean contemporary art and the international art world.

Kim received her B.F.A. from Ewha Womans University and her M.F.A. from Cranbrook Academy of Art, U.S.A. From 1993 to 2004, she was the Chief Curator at Artsonje Center, Seoul. In 2005, she was the commissioner of the Korean Pavilion  at the 51st Venice Biennale.  Also in 2005 she founded SAMUSO: Space for Contemporary Art, a curatorial office based in Seoul. Through SAMUSO Kim established Platform Seoul, an annual art festival whose editions have included: “Somewhere in Time, (2006)”, “Tomorrow” (2007), “I have nothing to say and I am saying it” (2008), “Platform in KIMUSA: Void of Memory” (2009) and “Projected Image” (2010). She co-curated “Your Bright Future,” an exhibition of 12  contemporary artists from Korea presented at the Los Angeles County Museum of Art and Houston Museum of Fine Arts (2009–10). Kim has also curated solo exhibitions for artists such as In-Hwan Oh, Martin Creed, Beom Kim and Haegue Yang at Artsonje Center. Kim was the Artistic Director of the 6th Seoul International Media Art Biennale - Media City Seoul 2010.

Kim was a Co-Artistic Director of ROUNDTABLE: The 9th Gwangju Biennale (Korea, 2012), for which her research explored the multiple layers of histories and narratives that enclose possibilities of intimacy, autonomy and anonymity within the urban sphere.

In 2013 she was ranked at number 94 in ArtReview Magazine's annual Power 100

References

External links
 Korea National University of Arts English Website
 Frieze

Living people
South Korean curators
South Korean women curators
Year of birth missing (living people)